Blue Planet II is a 2017 British nature documentary series on marine life produced by the BBC Natural History Unit. Like its predecessor, The Blue Planet (2001), it is narrated and presented by naturalist Sir David Attenborough.

After being announced in 2013, filming took four years in 39 countries over more than 125 international trips. The musical score was composed by Hans Zimmer, Jacob Shea and David Fleming, and English rock band Radiohead reworked their 2011 song "Bloom" with Zimmer specifically for the series.

The series debuted on 29 October 2017 and was simultaneously cast on BBC One, BBC One HD and BBC Earth, making it the first natural history series to premiere on the same day in the United Kingdom, Nordic regions, Europe and in Asia. In the United States, the series premiered on January 20, 2018, as part of a five-network simulcast on BBC America, AMC, IFC, Sundance, and WE tv.

The series received almost universal critical acclaim. It had the highest viewing figures of any television programme in the United Kingdom during 2017, and was so widely watched in China that it reportedly caused internet issues. It was credited with increasing public and political interest in issues affecting marine life, in particular marine plastic pollution, which was dubbed "the Blue Planet effect".

Background and production 
The series was announced by the BBC in 2013 with the working title Oceans, but the title was later changed to Blue Planet II as was revealed on 19 February 2017, making it a follow-up to the 2001 series The Blue Planet. Filming took place over a course of more than four years; involving 125 expeditions across 39 countries and produced more than 6,000 hours of underwater dive footage from over an estimated 4,000 dives.

Broadcast

British television 
The premiere of the series took place at Bristol's Cinema de Lux on 11 October 2017, with special guest appearance by Attenborough along with the producers and wildlife experts. Bristol has been the global home of BBC's Natural History programme making for the past 60 years. The series was first broadcast on 29 October 2017 (from 20:00 GMT to 21:00 GMT) on BBC One and BBC One HD. The first six episodes included a 10-minute making-of documentary called Into the Blue. The previous week's episode was repeated in an earlier time slot the following Sunday. The series was critically acclaimed and gained the highest UK viewing figure for 2017, 14.1 million.

International 
The BBC pre-sold the series to several overseas broadcasters, which includes Canada (Blue Ant Media’s licensed channel for BBC Earth), Australia (Channel Nine) and New Zealand (TVNZ), to Europe with Denmark (DR), Netherlands (NPO), Sweden (SVT), Spain (Telefonica’s BBC Earth block), Discovery Channel for Latin America and co-production partnerships with BBC America, Germany's WDR, France Télévisions, China's Tencent and CCTV-9. The series was eventually sold to more than 30 countries.

The series is set to broadcast internationally on BBC Earth channel, and also commercial television channels in various countries, besides. The series debuted in Nordic regions and other European countries on 29 October 2017. In Asia, the series began to premiere on each early Monday (from 04:05 SGT to 05:05 SGT) starting from 30 October 2017, the episode was then repeated on following each Tuesday evening (from 20:00 SGT). In Poland, it premiered on 16 November 2017. As for South Africa, it aired from 4 February 2018.

In China, the premiere took place at Shanghai's East China Normal University on 27 October 2017, with guest appearance by the producer Orla Doherty and Mike Gunton, the executive producer of Planet Earth II. The series is streaming broadcast at Tencent's QQLive from 30 October 2017, with episodes updating every Monday at 18:00 CST. It would also be broadcast on the state owned China Central Television’s documentary channel, CCTV-9, with episodes airing each Monday from 6 November 2017 at 21:00 CST.

In the Netherlands, the series is airing on the Dutch channel NPO 1, with episodes airing each Thursday from 28 December 2017. In Belgium, it will air on the Flemish channel Canvas, with episodes airing each Saturday starting from 2 January 2018.

The series aired in Canada and the United States on 20 January 2018. In Canada, it will broadcast with a three-network simulcast across BBC Earth, Cottage Life and T+E channel. In the United States, the series premiered the first episode – with a five-network simulcast across BBC America, AMC, IFC, WE tv and Sundance TV, while the remaining episodes continued to be aired every Saturday on BBC America. It is also available on BBCAmerica.com and the BBCA app.

As for Australia, the series will premiere on Nine Network and 9Now on 17 February 2018. In New Zealand, it premiered on 12 November 2017 on TVNZ 1.

For Singapore, the series premiered on Mediacorp Channel 5 on Sundays starting 27 May 2018.

In Greece, all the seven original episodes were broadcast from 12 April 2020 until 18 April 2020 at 10.30pm on the free-to-air television network Skai TV.

Episodes

Music

(ocean) bloom 
In September 2017, the BBC announced that the English rock band Radiohead had collaborated with composer Hans Zimmer to record a new version of "Bloom", a song from their 2011 album The King of Limbs. The new track, "(ocean) bloom", was recorded alongside the BBC Concert Orchestra. In a press release, Radiohead singer Thom Yorke said: "'Bloom' was inspired by the original Blue Planet series so it's great to be able to come full circle with the song." Zimmer and Radiohead worked with the orchestra in an attempt to emulate a 'tidal effect' in the music. The song was used as the soundtrack for a Blue Planet II prequel video released by the BBC to promote the series.

Soundtrack 

Composer Hans Zimmer returned to score the series. The musical score and songs featured in the series were composed by Hans Zimmer, Jacob Shea and David Fleming for Bleeding Fingers Music. It was recorded at Synchron Stage Vienna. 

A digital soundtrack was released on 29 October 2017, while a single physical disc was released on 1 December 2017 in the UK. The soundtrack was released as special edition LP for Record Store Day on 21 April 2018.

Reception

Critical reception
{{Rotten Tomatoes prose|97|9.4|32|Blue Planet II'''s hypnotic beauty is complemented by intense ethical musing, contrasting the micro and the macro in a humbling exploration of humanity's relationship with the ground it stands on.|ref=https://www.rottentomatoes.com/tv/blue_planet_ii/s01|access-date=9 March 2022}} In a positive review, Ed Yong of The Atlantic called Blue Planet II "the greatest nature series that the BBC has ever produced".The Guardian columnist George Monbiot criticised the series for mostly omitting the impact of the fishing industry on the oceans: "It's as if you were to make a film about climate breakdown without revealing the role of fossil fuel companies". Monbiot stated that the film's only mention of the fishing industry was a story "about how kind Norwegian herring boats are to orcas".

Impact
The programme has been credited with raising awareness of plastic pollution both domestically and internationally, an influence dubbed the 'Blue Planet effect'.

After the first episode aired in the UK, there was a surge in search engine enquiries about conservation charities, with the Marine Conservation Society, WWF and Plastic Oceans Foundation all receiving a significant spike in traffic. Following the programme's airing in the UK, the BBC announced its intention to completely ban single-use plastics within its organisation by 2020. In April 2018, in response to growing public support directly linked to Blue Planet II, the British government announced it was considering a national ban on single-use plastic products. It was also reported that Queen Elizabeth II's decision to ban plastic bottles and straws across the Royal estates was in part a response to the documentary. A 2020 study suggested that the programme triggered long-lasting increased political, media and public interest in plastic pollution in the UK, where previous efforts to do so had not been successful. Another study found that watching the single documentary did not influence participants to change their individual plastic consumption behaviour, even if they were made more aware of the issue or if it had a wider societal impact.

British universities such as the University of Southampton noticed a sudden increase in applications for marine biology courses following the programme's airing, which was again attributed to the 'Blue Planet effect'.

It was reported that the number of people in China simultaneously streaming Blue Planet II (approximately 80 million) had a noticeable impact upon internet speeds within the country. The popularity of the documentary in China was cited as partly the reason British prime minister Theresa May gave Chinese president Xi Jinping a Blue Planet II box set signed by David Attenborough. It was also symbolic of a joint plan to tackle plastic pollution and the illegal wildlife trade, announced by British officials during Xi's 2018 visit.

 Awards and nominations 

 Merchandise 
 DVD and Blu-ray 
The series was released as a three-disc DVD set as well as a standard Blu-ray set on 27 November 2017, and as a six-disc 4K UHD Blu-ray + Blu-ray set on 15 January 2018. It is distributed by BBC Worldwide in the UK.

In the US and Canada, the DVD, Blu-ray and 4K UHD Blu-ray sets were released on 6 March 2018 and distributed by BBC Worldwide Americas.

 Book 
An accompanying hardback book was written by James Honeyborne and Mark Brownlow, with foreword by David Attenborough. It was published by BBC Books. The book was released on 19 October 2017 in the UK and on 1 January 2018 in the US.

 Open University poster 
A free poster was made available through the Open University's OpenLearn website.

References

 External links 
 
 Blue Planet II at BBC Earth
 Blue Planet II at BBC Earth Asia
 Blue Planet II at BBC Media Centre
 Blue Planet II OpenLearn at The Open University
 
 Blue Planet II'' at NHK 

2010s British documentary television series
2017 British television series debuts
2017 British television series endings
BBC high definition shows
BBC television documentaries
BBC Television shows
David Attenborough
Documentary films about environmental issues
Documentary films about fish
Documentary films about marine biology
English-language television shows
Television series by BBC Studios
Television shows scored by Hans Zimmer